Lofty 88.9 (ACMA call sign 5LCM) is a community radio station based in Mount Barker, South Australia, named in reference to its location in the Mount Lofty Ranges.

The station operates in Peramangk country and is staffed entirely by volunteers.

History
Lofty Community Media Incorporated (Lofty) was formed in June 2017 as a progressive alternative to similar media outlets operating in the Adelaide Hills area.

Initially operating as an online-only radio station, Lofty was granted a temporary community broadcasting licence (TCBL) by the Australian Communications and Media Authority (ACMA) in November 2018

From November 2018, Lofty 88.9 shared the 88.9 MHz frequency with another TCBL holder, Hills Radio. During this period, Lofty 88.9 broadcast on Sundays, Mondays, and Tuesdays.

In October 2019, ACMA invited applications for a long-term community broadcasting licence in the Mount Barker area of the Adelaide Hills via a competitive process that attracted multiple applicants, including Lofty 88.9 and Hills Radio.

In September 2020, ACMA granted this licence to Lofty 88.9 based on Lofty’s application "demonstrating a strong focus on encouraging community participation in the operations and programming of the station".

Lofty 88.9 commenced broadcasting full-time on 1 October 2020.

Programming
Lofty 88.9 broadcasts a range of locally produced shows, along with a number of syndicated shows sourced from the Community Radio Network (Australia), Deutsche Welle and independent producers.

Awards
2018 SACBA Bilby Award for Best Sports Broadcast (runner-up)

2021 SACBA Bilby Awards for Youth Contribution (runner-up), Best Radio Program (runner-up), Sports Broadcast, Interview

Affiliations
Community Broadcasting Association of Australia (CBAA)

South Australian Community Broadcasters Association (SACBA)

References

External links
 Lofty 88.9 website

Community radio stations in Australia
Radio stations in South Australia
Radio stations established in 2017
2017 establishments in Australia